Aidan Kelly (born September 6, 1994) is an American slider who raced for the United States in the men's luge singles event at the 2014 Winter Olympics in Sochi, Russia.  He was the 2013 Norton junior U.S.A champion. Kelly resides in West Islip, New York. Kelly attended National Sports Academy in Lake Placid, New York. He graduated top of his class in 2012 while he also trained at the U.S. Olympic Training Center also in Lake Placid, 
.

References

External links
 

American male lugers
1994 births
Living people
Lugers at the 2014 Winter Olympics
Place of birth missing (living people)
Olympic lugers of the United States
People from West Islip, New York